Pasiphae , formerly spelled Pasiphaë, is a retrograde irregular satellite  of Jupiter. It was discovered in 1908 by Philibert Jacques Melotte and later named after the mythological Pasiphaë, wife of Minos and mother of the Minotaur from Greek legend.

The moon was first spotted on a plate taken at the Royal Greenwich Observatory on the night of 28 February 1908. Inspection of previous plates found it as far back as January 27. It received the provisional designation , as it was not clear whether it was an asteroid or a moon of Jupiter. The recognition of the latter case came by April 10.

It was sometimes called "Poseidon" between 1955 and 1975.

Orbit

Pasiphae orbits Jupiter on a high eccentricity and high inclination retrograde orbit. It gives its name to the Pasiphae group, irregular retrograde moons orbiting Jupiter at distances ranging between 22.8 and 24.1 million km, and with inclinations ranging between 144.5° and 158.3°. The orbital elements are as of January 2000.  They are continuously changing due to solar and planetary perturbations. The diagram illustrates its orbit in relation to other retrograde irregular satellites of Jupiter. The eccentricity of selected orbits is represented by the yellow segments (extending from the pericentre to the apocentre). The outermost regular satellite Callisto is located for reference.

Pasiphae is also known to be in a secular resonance with Jupiter (tying the longitude of its perijove with the longitude of perihelion of Jupiter).

Physical characteristics

With diameter estimated at 60 km Pasiphae is the largest retrograde and third largest irregular satellite after Himalia and Elara.

Spectroscopical measurements in infrared indicate that Pasiphae is a spectrally featureless object, consistent with the suspected asteroidal origin of the object. Pasiphae is believed to be a fragment from a captured asteroid along with other Pasiphae group satellites.

In the visual spectrum the satellite appears grey (colour indices B-V=0.74, R-V=0.38) similar to C-type asteroids.

See also
Irregular satellites

References

External links
Pasiphae Profile by NASA's Solar System Exploration
David Jewitt pages
Scott Sheppard pages
 MPC: Natural Satellites Ephemeris Service

Moons of Jupiter
Irregular satellites
19080127
Pasiphae group
Moons with a retrograde orbit